Maurício Matos Peixoto, (April 15, 1921, in Fortaleza, Ceará – April 28, 2019, in Rio de Janeiro), was a Brazilian engineer and mathematician. He pioneered the studies on structural stability, and was the author of Peixoto's theorem.

Biography

Once, while talking with his mentor, Solomon Lefschetz, Maurício Peixoto commented that no one cared about structural stability of dynamical systems and that was the main problem in working with it. But to Peixoto's surprise Lefschetz's answer was no less than "No Mauricio, this is no trouble, this is your luck. Try to work as hard and as fast as you can on this subject because the day will come when you will not understand a single word of what they will be saying about structural stability; this happened to me in topology." 
Lefschetz's support was very important to Peixoto at the time. In 1957, Peixoto went to research the subject with Lefschetz at the Princeton University, where he spent uncountable hours talking to the Russian professor about Mathematics and other subjects. Despite of the great age difference (Peixoto was 36 years old and Lefschetz 73), they became good friends.

With Lefschetz incentive, Peixoto wrote his first paper on structural stability, that would be later published on the Annals of Mathematics, of which Lefschetz was editor. In 1958, they went to the International Mathematical Congress, in Edinburgh, Scotland, where Lefschetz introduced Peixoto to the Russian mathematician Lev Pontryagin, whose work on dynamical systems was used by Peixoto as a basis for his studies. Pontryagin, though, showed no interest whatsoever in Peixoto's work.

Back to Princeton, Peixoto met Steve Smale, the mathematician that would later become a reference in dynamical systems. Smale was interested in Peixoto's work and realized he could extend his own based on it. Their contact intensified and, when Peixoto came back to Brazil, the American mathematician spent six months at the Instituto Nacional de Matemática Pura e Aplicada (Institute of Pure and Applied Mathematics or IMPA) at Rio de Janeiro. Through Smale, Peixoto would meet the French mathematician René Thom, who would help Peixoto to formulate his theorem, that was finalized during Thom's visit to IMPA.

Awards 

For his theorem, Peixoto won the Bunge Foundation Award in the year of 1969. According to Bunge Foundation, "the theorem of Peixoto on the structural stability in two-dimensional varieties inspired the mathematician S. Smale to create the general theory of dynamic systems".

In 1986, Peixoto was awarded the TWAS Prize by the Third World Science Academy, "for his fundamental and pioneer studies on structural stability in dynamical systems, in particular for proving that surface flows are generically structurally stable."

Personal life 
Peixoto married engineer and mathematician Marília Magalhães Chaves (who was known professionally by her married name) Marília Chaves Peixoto in 1946, with whom he had two children, Marta and Ricardo. The couple collaborated in their work, jointly published "Structural Stability in the plane with enlarged boundary conditions" in 1959, before Marília Chaves Peixoto's early death in 1961. It would be a key paper which led to the development of Peixoto's theorem.

References

 

 

1921 births
2019 deaths
People from Fortaleza
20th-century Brazilian mathematicians
Instituto Nacional de Matemática Pura e Aplicada researchers
TWAS laureates